Direct Corporate Access (DCA) is part of the Faster Payments Service which provides a same day clearing payment service to UK member banks. Direct Corporate Access (DCA) will provide Banks' business customers with direct access to the Faster Payments Service (FPS) clearing service in a very similar way that Bacstel-IP provides access to BACS.

Direct Corporate Access only enables submission of files of payments, however as the central FPS processes payments individually, VocaLink the operators of DCA will split the files into individual instructions for processing through FPS.

It was developed by APACS on behalf of the FPS member banks and the infrastructure went live in March 2009. Barclays was the first bank live for customer sponsorship in August 2009.

Albany Software was the first solution supplier to successfully process a payment through the Faster Payments Service via DCA, using Albany ePAY on Wednesday 22 July 2009.

Key features
 DCA is available for file submission 7 days a week 24 hours a day (from September 2011).
 Sterling payments only
 Maximum individual payment value is £250,000 (from 10 November 2015)
 Payments submitted in files via the Secure-IP channel
 Beneficiaries must use FPS addressable sort codes
 DCA users must be sponsored by their bankers (as of 2017, Barclays and HSBC are the only banks offering DCA sponsorship).
 Uses the Bacs Standard 18 formatting, but only allows transaction code 99 (Direct Credit)

Secure-IP
Secure-IP is a clone of the existing Bacstel-IP channel used for BACS. Files of payments are secured using a smart card or hardware security module (HSM).

Files of payments submitted by Secure-IP will be disaggregated by VocaLink, the operators of DCA, and submitted into the Faster Payments Service. Disaggregation and acceptance may take up to thirty minutes and beneficiaries will receive access to the funds within two hours of acceptance.

The software used to access Secure-IP must be approved. This is an extension to the existing Bacs Approved Software Service (BASS). In March 2009 Albany Software and Bottomline Technologies received approved status for their first DCA capable products. They were joined in May 2009 by Barron McCann. In 2010 they were joined by Direct Debit Ltd. (now part of Bottomline) and Experian. In 2011 they were joined by Fundtech.

Timescales
DCA payments are processed by the sponsoring bank according to their Service Level Agreements - for Barclays this is currently a maximum of 30 minutes before the payment is sent to the beneficiary bank. Beneficiary banks which are members of FPS must apply the funds to the beneficiary account within 2 hours, although in most cases it is done immediately.

Bureaux
Bureau organisations can submit files of payments on behalf of other registered service users of Direct Corporate Access.

The bureau needs to be sponsored by a DCA-enabled bank (initially only Barclays) and to use a bureau/DCA version of the approved Bacs Approved Software Service (BASS) software.

The bureau's sponsor bank issues PKI certificates for authorising files in the form of a smart card or hardware security module (HSM). The same PKI certificates can be used to authorise Bacs file submissions via Bacstel-IP.

File submissions can only be made on behalf service of users of a DCA-enabled bank (initially only Barclays).

Weaknesses
 Bureau can only submit for their clients who are sponsored by Barclays.

Alternative products
 Royal Bank of Scotland (including National Westminster and Coutts Banks) and HSBC offer Faster Payments via their electronic banking channels (Bankline and HSBC.Net).

Notes

External links
 APACS Connection Methods
 Barclays DCA Customer Presentation

Payment systems
Banking terms
Banking technology